Woodlawn is an unincorporated area and census-designated place (CDP) in Prince George's County, Maryland, United States. As of the 2020 census it had a population of 7,541.

Geography
Woodlawn is located at  (38.949361, −76.898016).

According to the United States Census Bureau, the community has a total area of 1.1 square miles (2.9 km), all land.

Demographics

2020 census

Note: the US Census treats Hispanic/Latino as an ethnic category. This table excludes Latinos from the racial categories and assigns them to a separate category. Hispanics/Latinos can be of any race.

2000 Census
As of the census of 2000, there were 6,251 people, 2,068 households, and 1,565 families residing in the community. The racial makeup of the community was 17.45% White, 72.34% African American, 0.38% Native American, 2.21% Asian, 0.10% Pacific Islander, 4.86% from other races, and 2.66% from two or more races. Hispanic or Latino of any race were 9.55% of the population.

There were 2,068 households, out of which 38.6% had children under the age of 18 living with them, 45.3% were married couples living together, 22.8% had a female householder with no husband present, and 24.3% were non-families. 19.5% of all households were made up of individuals, and 5.9% had someone living alone who was 65 years of age or older. The average household size was 3.02 and the average family size was 3.45.

In the community the population was spread out, with 29.7% under the age of 18, 9.2% from 18 to 24, 31.2% from 25 to 44, 22.0% from 45 to 64, and 7.8% who were 65 years of age or older. The median age was 33 years. For every 100 females, there were 95.1 males. For every 100 females age 18 and over, there were 90.8 males.

The median income for a household in the community was $54,250, and the median income for a family was $60,392. Males had a median income of $33,872 versus $34,531 for females. The per capita income for the community was $19,709. About 5.2% of families and 6.6% of the population were below the poverty line, including 8.5% of those under age 18 and 5.6% of those age 65 or over.

In 2000, 6.1% of Woodlawn residents identified as being of Nigerian heritage. This was the highest percentage of Nigerian Americans of any place in the country.

Education
It is within the Prince George's County School District.

Zoned schools include:
 Elementary (all in the CDP): Beacon Heights, Glenridge, and Woodridge
 Charles Carroll Middle School in New Carrollton
 Parkdale High School in Riverdale Park

References

Census-designated places in Prince George's County, Maryland
Census-designated places in Maryland
Washington metropolitan area